Poecilium lividum is a species of long-horned beetle in the family Cerambycidae. The species is found mainly in Europe, and is adventive in North America.

References

External links

 

Callidiini
Beetles described in 1794